Fuson is a surname. Notable people with the surname include:

 Grady Fuson (born 1956), American baseball executive
 Lisa Fuson (born 1963), American voice actress
 Reynold C. Fuson (1895–1979), American chemist
 Stacy Marie Fuson (born 1978), American model

See also
 Fuson, Missouri, a community in the United States